Ernest Taylor may refer to:

Ernest Taylor (Australian rules footballer) (1898–1980), played for the Richmond Football Club between 1920 and 1926
Ernie Taylor (footballer, born 1925) (1925–1985), English footballer with Newcastle United, Blackpool, Manchester United and Sunderland
Ernie Taylor (footballer, born 1871) (1871–1944), English footballer with Southampton
Ernest Taylor (rugby union) (1869–?), English rugby union footballer and captain of the national side
Sir Ernest Augustus Taylor (1876–1971), British Royal Navy officer and politician
Ernest Mervyn Taylor (1906–1964), New Zealand engraver, commercial artist and publisher